Japan participated in the 2010 Asian Games in Guangzhou, China on 12–27 November 2010.

Archery

Men

Women

Athletics

Men 

Track events

Field events

Road events

Combined events

Badminton

Men
{|class=wikitable style="font-size:90%"
|-
!rowspan=2|Athlete
!rowspan=2|Event
!Round of 32
!Round of 16
!Quarterfinals
!Semifinals
!Final
|-
!OppositionScore
!OppositionScore
!OppositionScore
!OppositionScore
!OppositionScore
|-
|Kazushi Yamada
|rowspan=2|Singles
|align=center|W 2-0(21-2, 21-10)
|align=center|L 0-2(15-21, 15-21)
|align=center colspan="7"|did not advance
|-
|Kenichi Tago
|align=center|L 0-2(13-21, 14-21)
|align=center colspan="7"|did not advance
|-
|Hirokatsu Hashimoto  Noriyasu Hirata
|rowspan=2|Doubles
|align=center|W 2-0(21-10, 21-9)
|align=center|W '''2-0(21-16, 21-19)
|align=center|}L 1-2(19-21, 21-13, 18-21)
|align=center colspan="7"|did not advance
|-
|Hiroyuki Endo  Kenichi Hayakawa
|align=center|W 2-0(21-17, 21-6)
|align=center|L 1-2(15-21, 21-19, 17-21)
|align=center colspan="7"|did not advance
|-
|Hiroyuki Endo  Kenichi HayakawaHirokatsu Hashimoto  Noriyasu HirataShintaro Ikeda  Sho SasakiKazushi Yamada  Kenichi Tago
|Team
| style="background:wheat;"|
|align=center|W 3-0(2-0, 2-0, 2-0)
|align=center|W 1-3(2-1, 0-2, 0-2, 0-2)
|align=center colspan="7"|did not advance
|}

Women

Mixed

Baseball

Team
Mitsugu KitamichiYusuke UedaTakuya HashimotoKen KumeTomohisa IwashitaYuichi TabataSho UenoKeiji IkebeKenichi YokoyamaHidenori WatanabeYusuke IshidaTakashi FujitaHirofumi YamanakaKoichi KotakaKota SudaDaiki EnokidaManabu MimaAtsushi KobayashiYasuyuki SaigoRyo SaekiNariaki KawasakiToshiyuki HayashiHayata ItoTsugio AbePreliminariesPool ASemifinalsBronze medal matchBasketball

Men
Team
Tomoo AminoKenta HiroseTakumi IshizakiShunsuke ItoHiroyuki KinoshitaYusuke OkadaRyota SakuraiYuta TabuseKen TakedaJoji TakeuchiKosuke TakeuchiDaiji YamadaPreliminary roundGroup FQuarterfinalsSemifinalsBronze medal gameWomen
Team
Yoko NagiMaki TakadaYuka MamiyaAi MitaniAyumi SuzukiHiromi SuwaSaori FujiyoshiYoshie SakuradaAsami YoshidaYuko OgaReika TakahashiSachiko IshikawaPreliminary roundGroup BSemifinalsBronze medal gameBeach volleyball

Men

Women

Board games

Chess

Weiqi

Xiangqi

Bowling

MenAll eventsMastersWomenAll eventsMasters'''

Boxing

References

Nations at the 2010 Asian Games
2010
Asian Games